Kit and Ace is a Canadian clothing brand.

History 
Kit and Ace was founded in 2014 by Shannon Wilson, former lead designer of Lululemon Athletica, and her stepson J. J. Wilson. 

The company was founded to sell machine-washable cashmere wool clothing and accessories. The first store opened in July 2014 in Vancouver's Gastown neighbourhood.

In 2015, the brand opened retail stores in the US, the UK and Australia. 

In September 2015, the company installed shop-in-shop cafes from Toronto-based Sorry Coffee Co. in its London and Toronto stores.

In April 2017, Kit and Ace closed all its international stores, focusing on e-commerce and its eight Canadian shops. Hold It All Inc., a Vancouver-based company, owned the brand until the end of August 2018. 

In 2018, CEO George Tsogas acquired it from the company's founders and changed the brand direction creating apparel that is Smart, Easy to Love, and Made to Last on a mission to Amplify Optimism in the world.

In November 2019, Kit and Ace opens its first West Vancouver location in The Village, Park Royal.

In December 2020, Kit and Ace returns to Edmonton opening a new location on Whyte Ave.

In June 2022, Kit and Ace opened a new location on Queen Street in Toronto.

Awards 
In 2018, the Navigator pant was selected as part of the "Ultimate Travel Gear" of 2018 by enRoute Magazine.

References

External links
 Official website

Clothing brands of Canada
Clothing companies of Canada
Retail companies established in 2014
2014 establishments in British Columbia
Companies based in Vancouver